General elections were held in Kuwait on 23 October 1996. A total of 230 candidates contested the election, which saw pro-government candidates win the largest number of seats. Voter turnout was 83%.

Results

Aftermath
Following the elections Ahmed Al-Sadoun was elected Speaker, defeating Jassem Al-Kharafi.

References

Kuwait
Election
Elections in Kuwait
Non-partisan elections